Khary Stockton (born September 15, 1971 in Alexandria, Virginia) is a retired U.S. soccer midfielder who spent his entire career in the lower U.S. and Brazilian divisions.  Since 2007, he is the head coach of the University of the District of Columbia.

Career
Stockton attended the College of William and Mary, playing on the men’s soccer team from 1989 to 1992.  He graduated with a bachelor's degree in anthropology in 1993.  That year, he began his professional career with the newly established Richmond Kickers in the USISL.  He played six games, scored three goals and then moved to Brazil.  In September 1993, he signed with Atlético Sorocaba in the Brazilian Third Division.  On May 27, 1994, he joined A.E. Velo Clube in the Brazilian Second Division.  In 1995, he moved back to the United States where he rejoined the Kickers who went on to win the 1995 U.S. Open Cup.  On February 8, 1996, the MetroStars selected Stockton in the 12th round of the 1996 MLS Inaugural Player Draft.  On March 26, 1996, the MetroStars waived Stockton as part of a preseason roster reduction.  He then moved to the Milwaukee Rampage.  In 1997, he spent a single season with the Carolina Dynamo.  He moved again for the 1998 season, this time to the New Orleans Storm before playing for the Lehigh Valley Steam in 1999.  The Steam folded at the end of the season and he played for the Northern Virginia Royals in 2000.  In 2001, he moved to the Milwaukee Rampage before finishing his career with the Richmond Kickers in 2002 and 2003.

Stockton spent three seasons as an assistant at The Catholic University of America.  On July 16, 2007, he became the head coach at the University of the District of Columbia.

References

External links
University of District of Columbia
USL Player Profile

American soccer coaches
American soccer players
Catholic University of America people
American expatriate soccer players
Soccer players from Alexandria, Virginia
North Carolina Fusion U23 players
Clube Atlético Sorocaba players
Lehigh Valley Steam players
Milwaukee Rampage players
New Orleans Riverboat Gamblers players
Northern Virginia Royals players
Richmond Kickers players
USISL players
Expatriate footballers in Brazil
UDC Firebirds men's soccer coaches
William & Mary Tribe men's soccer players
Sportspeople from Alexandria, Virginia
1971 births
Living people
Association football midfielders
American expatriate sportspeople in Brazil
New Orleans Storm players
Catholic University Cardinals